John Charles Pratt, 4th Marquess Camden  (9 February 1872 – 15 December 1943), briefly styled Earl of Brecknock in 1872, was a British peer.

Background and education
Camden was born at Eaton Square, London, the third but only surviving son of John Pratt, 3rd Marquess Camden, by Lady Clementina Augusta, daughter of George Spencer-Churchill, 6th Duke of Marlborough. He was a first cousin of Lord Randolph Churchill on his mother's side. He succeeded to the marquessate at the age of two months on the early death of his father, and was subsequently educated at Eton and Trinity College, Cambridge.

Career
In 1905 Camden was appointed Lord-Lieutenant of Kent, a position he held until his death. He fought in the First World War as a Major in the West Kent Yeomanry Cavalry, where he was awarded the Territorial Decoration. He was also a deputy lieutenant of Sussex between 1894 and 1922 as well as a justice of the peace for the county. He was appointed a Knight Grand Cross of the Royal Victorian Order in 1933. From 1942 to 1943 he was commodore of the prestigious Royal Yacht Squadron.

Family

Lord Camden married Lady Joan Marion, daughter of Henry Nevill, 3rd Marquess of Abergavenny, in 1898. They had two sons and two daughters. He died in December 1943, aged 71, and was succeeded in the marquessate by his eldest son, John. The Marchioness Camden died in July 1952, aged 74.

His daughter Lady Fiona Pratt married firstly Sir Gerard Fuller, 2nd Baronet and secondly the Earl of Normanton, becoming the mother of the third Baronet and of Shaun Agar, 6th Earl of Normanton.

References

External links

1872 births
1943 deaths
People educated at Eton College
Knights Grand Cross of the Royal Victorian Order
Lord-Lieutenants of Kent
Deputy Lieutenants of Sussex
British Army personnel of World War I
People from Westminster
Military personnel from London
Queen's Own West Kent Yeomanry officers
John
English justices of the peace
4